Patrick Delvan Westrum (born March 3, 1948 in Minneapolis, Minnesota) is a retired professional ice hockey defenseman who played 237 regular season games in the World Hockey Association for the Minnesota Fighting Saints, Calgary Cowboys and Birmingham Bulls between 1974 and 1978. Westrum also was a member of the United States national team at the 1978 Ice Hockey World Championship tournament in Prague. Westrum retired in 2018 from serving as an amateur scout in the Western Canada region for the Montreal Canadiens.

External links

The Complete Historical and Statistical Reference to the World Hockey Association by Scott Surgent, Xaler Press, 

1948 births
Living people
American men's ice hockey defensemen
Birmingham Bulls players
Boston Braves players
Calgary Cowboys players
Dayton Gems players
Des Moines Oak Leafs players
Minnesota Golden Gophers men's ice hockey players
Minnesota Fighting Saints players
Montreal Canadiens scouts
Johnstown Jets (NAHL) players
Oklahoma City Blazers (1965–1977) players
Oklahoma City Stars players
Springfield Indians players
Ice hockey people from Minneapolis